The Huerfano River Wind Farm is a producer of  distributed generation (DG) power located ten miles north of Walsenburg, just off of Interstate 25. The farm uses four Sany-made 2 MW turbines and feeds into the San Isabel Electric Association grid.

The farm is owned by Tamra-Tacoma Capital Partners, a New York-based investment firm.  The firm initiated litigation against Sany America on August 31, 2016, alleging Sany fraudulently misrepresented the plant's production and had no maintenance program, leaving the asset "worthless" according to the complaint.  On February 6, 2019, the case was settled and subsequently dismissed with prejudice.

See also

Wind power in Colorado
List of onshore wind farms

References

Wind farms in Colorado
Buildings and structures in Huerfano County, Colorado
Energy infrastructure completed in 2013